The list of shipwrecks in September 1829 includes some ships sunk, wrecked or otherwise lost during September 1829.

1 September

4 September

5 September

7 September

8 September

9 September

10 September

13 September

14 September

16 September

19 September

20 September

21 September

22 September

23 September

24 September

27 September

28 September

29 September

30 September

Unknown date

References

1829-09